Looney Tunes Super Stars' Daffy Duck: Frustrated Fowl is a DVD of 15 new-to-DVD Daffy Duck cartoons that was released on August 10, 2010.

Contents 
 All cartoons on this disc star Daffy Duck.
 LT = Looney Tunes
 MM = Merrie Melodies

Controversies 

This was one of two first Looney Tunes Super Stars that released the majority of some of the cartoons from the post-1953 era, but in a 1:85 widescreen format. Warner Bros. has stated the reason for this was because that was how the post-1953 cartoons were shown in theaters, which made many collectors upset as cartoons were filmed in Academy full-screened ratio, not widescreen.

In 2011 Ducking the Devil was re-released in its correct 4:3 aspect ratio as part of the Looney Tunes Platinum Collection: Volume 1 Blu-Ray and DVD set. In 2020 the cartoons This Is a Life?, Person to Bunny and People Are Bunny were re-released as part of the Bugs Bunny 80th Anniversary Collection Blu-Ray set, once again presented in their original 4:3 aspect ratios.

Notes

References 

Chicken Run

Looney Tunes home video releases